Percy Cornelius Vinnell (1879 – 23 February 1938) was a New Zealand businessman and Mayor of Timaru.

Born in Oxfordshire, England in 1879 the son of Cornelius Vinnell and Joanna (née Pursey), Vinnell was educated at St Paul's School in Oxford before coming to New Zealand in 1913. He spent two years in Wellington, working at a boot factory before moving to Timaru after his marriage where he set up business as a boot manufacturer at the Canterbury Shoe Company.

Percy was first elected to the Timaru Borough Council in 1919, and served under three Mayors. He succeeded T. W. Satterthwaite as Mayor in June 1936 after his sudden death.

Vinnell died on 23 February 1938.

Further reading

1879 births
1938 deaths
New Zealand businesspeople
New Zealand people of English descent
Mayors of Timaru
New Zealand Labour Party politicians
Unsuccessful candidates in the 1919 New Zealand general election
Unsuccessful candidates in the 1922 New Zealand general election
Unsuccessful candidates in the 1925 New Zealand general election